Kacper Sezonienko (born 23 March 2003) is a Polish professional footballer who plays as a forward for Lechia Gdańsk.

Career

Lechia Gdańsk
Sezonienko started playing football with AP Ostróda aged 8, later joining the youth sides of Lechia Gdańsk in 2018. At the age of 16 Sezonienko first played for the Lechia Gdańsk II team, making his debut against  Arka Gdynia II. Sezonienko started training with the first team at the beginning of the 2019–20 season. In August 2020 it was announced that he would be spending the season with Bytovia Bytów.

References

2003 births
Living people
Polish footballers
Poland youth international footballers
Association football forwards
Lechia Gdańsk players
Lechia Gdańsk II players
Bytovia Bytów players
Ekstraklasa players
II liga players
IV liga players
Polish people of Ukrainian descent